The Museum of North Caucasus Railway is a railway museum in Rostov-on-Don, Rostov oblast, Russia, which opened on 1 August 2003. It consists of a room in a Community Center of railwaymen and a display area 12,400 m² at Glubokaya halt on the south-west outskirts of Rostov-on-Don.

The first museum of history of North Caucasus Railway opened on 4 November 1960 in a Community Center of railwaymen at Rostov-Glavny station. Permanent exposition includes: information boards about famous North Caucasus railwaymen, model trains on a scale 1:15, uniform, cases, panoramas, implements of various times. The exhibition covers the period from emergence of rail transport in the region up to the present moment. The various collections from the Russian Civil War and the Great Patriotic War, now exceed 12,000 objects in the main fund.

The display area at Glubokaya halt opened on 1 August 2003, which marked celebrations of Railwayman's Day. Historical rolling stock (60 locomotives and carriages) is exhibiting here. Also 19 locomotives and carriages are reserves at Rostov-Zapadny station. A lot of steam locomotives in the museum are in good condition. This rolling stock participates in historical reconstructions, filmings and celebratory parades. The total length of the exhibition tracks is 1.9 km.

Exhibits 

The exhibition presents freight and passenger carriages, motor locomotives, track motorcars, draisines, maintenance vehicles, semaphore, light-traffic, water crane.  The oldest object is a tank car for chemicals from the late 19th century. The following full-size locomotives and electric multiple unit are on display.

Locomotives 
Class E steam locomotive
Class FD  steam locomotive
Class L steam locomotive
Class P36 steam locomotive
Class TE steam locomotive (trophy german Class 52)
Class SO steam locomotive
Class Su steam locomotive
Class TE3 diesel locomotive
Class TEP60 diesel locomotive
Class TEP10 diesel locomotive
Class TEM1 diesel locomotive
Class TU10 narrow gauge diesel locomotive
Class VL8 electric locomotive
Class VL22m electric locomotive
Class VL41 electric locomotive
Class VL61 electric locomotive
Class VL80 electric locomotive
Class VL84 electric locomotive
Class ChS4 electric locomotive

Electric multiple unit 
ER22 series electric multiple unit (two driving cars and a power car)

References 

Tourist attractions in Rostov Oblast
Museums established in 1960
Museums established in 2003
Railway museums in Russia
Museums in Rostov Oblast